The Dongdu–Pingyi railway or Dongping railway, is a railroad in northern China between Dongdu, near Xintai, and Pingyi central Shandong Province. The line,  in length was built from 2009 to 2010 at the cost of 1.2558 billion Renminbi. The line is jointly owned by the Jinan Railway Bureau, Laiwu Iron & Steel Group, Xinwen Mining Enterprises Group and Port of Rizhao Joint Stock Company, and serves primarily to carry coal mined in central Shandong and imported iron ore to steel mills in Laiwu and exported steel products to the Port of Rizhao.

History
The railway opened on 22 November 2010.

Rail connections
 Pingyi: Yanzhou–Shijiusuo railway
 Dongdu: Ciyao–Laiwu railway

See also

 List of railways in China

References

Railway lines in China
Rail transport in Shandong
Railway lines opened in 2010